A Philip Roth Reader is a selection of writings by Philip Roth first published in 1980 by Farrar, Straus and Giroux, with a revised version reprinted in 1993 by Vintage Books. Both editions include selections from Roth's first eight novels (up to The Ghost Writer), along with the previously uncollected story "Novotny's Pain" and the essay-story "Looking at Kafka."

1980 short story collections
Books by Philip Roth
Farrar, Straus and Giroux books
American short story collections